This is a list of Chinese football transfers for the 2014 season winter transfer window. Only moves from Super League and League One are listed. The transfer window opened on 1 January 2014 and closed on 28 February 2014.

Super League

Beijing Guoan

In:

 
 

 
 

 

Out:

Changchun Yatai

In:

 

 

 
 
 

Out:

Dalian Aerbin

In:

 

Out:

Guangzhou Evergrande

In:

Out:

Guangzhou R&F

In:
 

Out:

Guizhou Renhe

In:

 
 
 

 

 
 
 

Out:

Hangzhou Greentown

In:

 

Out:

Harbin Yiteng

In:

 

 

Out:

Henan Jianye

In:

 

Out:

Jiangsu Sainty

In:

 

Out:

Liaoning Whowin

In:

 

 

 
 
 

 
 

Out:

Shandong Luneng

In:

Out:

Shanghai Shenhua

In:

 

Out:

Shanghai Shenxin

In:

Out:

Shanghai SIPG

In:

Out:

Tianjin Teda

In:

 

Out:

References

China
2013-14
2014 in Chinese football